This is a list of all cricketers who have captained Canada in an official international match. This includes the ICC Trophy, Under-19's games and One Day Internationals. The table is correct as of the 2007 Cricket World Cup. The current captain of Canadian national team is Saad Bin Zafar, he was appointed as the captain in October 2022.

One Day Internationals

Canada played their first ODI on June 9, 1979.

Twenty20 Internationals

Canada played their first Twenty20 Internationals on August 2, 2008.

ICC Trophy

Canada debuted in the ICC Trophy in the 1979 tournament

Youth One-Day International captains

This is a list of Canadian cricketers who have captained their country in an Under-19's ODI.

External links
Cricinfo
Canada's ICC Trophy captains at Cricket Archive 
Canada's Under-19's captains at Cricket Archive 

Canada in international cricket
Cricket Captains
Canada